Kalundborg Gymnasium is a municipal gymnasium in Kalundborg Municipality, Denmark. Established on 12 August 1957 as a high school, the first rector was R. Stig Hansen. , the rector is Peter Abildgaard Andersen, who has held the position since August 2006.

In 1963 a wing was built with new classrooms, specialist classrooms and an assembly hall, which today is the canteen. In 1976 the school was expanded with new wings containing classrooms, chemistry rooms, music rooms, a new assembly hall, auditorium, stage and library. In 2001 a new wing was added with 4 large classrooms and open study areas. In 2003 the canteen kitchen was completely renovated and in 2004 new chairs and tables were added in the cafeteria area.

The gymnasium has approximately 700 students, 24 classes and about 70 teachers. It offers degree programs in science, language, music and social studies. In the first week of October 2007, it hosted the annual Euro Week.

Notable alumni
Famous alumni of Kalundborg Gymnasium include:

 Kamilla Kristensen (midfielder, handball)
 Stine Stengade (actor)
 Fallulah (singer)
 Marianne Larsen (writer)
 Milena Penkowa (neuroscientist)
 Christian E. Christiansen (director)

External links
Official website (Danish)

Schools in Denmark
Educational institutions established in 1957
Buildings and structures in Kalundborg Municipality
1957 establishments in Denmark
Gymnasium